Mantung is a town and a locality in the Australian state of South Australia located in the state's south-east about  east of the state capital of Adelaide, and about  north-east and about  south-west respectively of the municipal seats of Karoonda and Loxton.

"Mantung" is reported as the Aboriginal name of a waterhole in the area. A school opened there in 1921 and closed in 1944.

Mantung was one of the towns along the Waikerie railway line after it opened in 1914. The town was surveyed in 1915. Despite the railway closing around 1990, the town hall has continued to be used by the community.

The historic Elizabeth Well Ruins are listed on the South Australian Heritage Register.

The 2016 Australian census which was conducted in August 2016 reports that Mantung had a population of 21 people.

Mantung is located within the federal division of Barker, the state electoral districts of Chaffey and Hammond, and the local government areas of the District Council of Karoonda East Murray and the District Council of Loxton Waikerie.

See also
 Hundred of Mantung

References

Towns in South Australia